Ranatantra is a 2016 Indian Kannada-language romantic action thriller film written and directed by Aadiram making his debut. and produced by S.Ramesh. It features Vijay Raghavendra and Hariprriya in the lead roles. The supporting cast includes Sathyajith, Bhajarangi Madhu, Vishal Hedge and Aishwarya Sindhogi. The movie is a remake of 2008 Tamil movie Silandhi which itself was loosely based on the English movie I Know What You Did Last Summer.
The movie was dubbed in Telugu as Suryakala, in Tamil as Idi Pedda Saithan and in Hindi as Agniputra. The score and soundtrack for the film is by M. Karthik and the cinematography is by Rajesh K.Narayan.

Cast
Vijay Raghavendra as Goutham
Hariprriya as Swarna
Sathyajith
Vishal Hedge
Bhajarangi Madhu
Aishwarya Sindhogi

Soundtrack

The film's background score and the soundtracks are composed by M.Karthik. The music rights were acquired by T-Series.

References

External links
 

2010s Kannada-language films
Indian action thriller films
2016 action thriller films
Indian romantic action films
2010s romantic thriller films
Indian romantic thriller films
2016 directorial debut films
Films shot in Mysore
Films shot in Bangalore
2010s romantic action films
Kannada remakes of Tamil films